Died in the Wool – Manafon Variations is a remix album by English singer and musician David Sylvian, released in May 2011 by Sylvian's independent label Samadhi Sound. The album features six songs from Sylvian's 2009 album Manafon, which have been remixed by Dai Fujikura. The new songs are heavily influenced by Fujikura, who conducted, arranged and composed the prevalent strings sections.  "I Should Not Dare" and "A Certain Slant of Light" are poems by Emily Dickinson, set to music and sung by Sylvian.

The second CD is a 18-minute long stereo mix extract from the 2008–09 Biennial of Canaries, for which Sylvian, with Fujikura, wrote a piece of music as a sound installation. The instrumental piece was over 50 minutes long and was recorded on Gran Canaria of the Canary Islands. It was mixed by Sylvian in 5:1 surround sound and mastered by Steve D’Agostino. It was inspired by an 2003 article on genetics research in the Canary Islands.

"A Certain Slant of Light" is a remix of the Sylvian's 2010 release for the Mick Karn Appeal, which is referenced in this version with the bracketed "For M.K".

Track listing

Personnel 
Musicians

 David Sylvian – vocals, sampling (2, 6, 10), electronics (2, 6), electric guitar (3), keyboards (4, 7), acoustic guitar (4, 6)
 Keith Rowe – guitar (2, 4, 6, 7, 11)
 Erik Carlson – violin (1, 6, 7, 9, 10, 12)
 Jennifer Curtis – violin (1, 4, 6, 7, 9, 10, 12)
 Margaret Dyer – viola (1, 6, 7, 9, 10, 12)
 Christopher Gross – cello (1, 6, 7, 9, 10, 12)
 Marcio Mattos – cello (6)
 Dai Fujikura – strings conductor (1, 6, 7, 9, 10, 12), sampling (2, 11), strings arrangement (4, 6, 10, 12), strings composer (7, 9), flute conductor and arrangement (10, 12)
 Steve Jansen – cymbals (2)
 Eddie Prévost – percussion (2, 2–1)
 Kate Romano – clarinet samples (2)
 John Butcher – saxophone (2, 2–1)
 Erik Honoré – sampling (2, 5, 11), electronics (1–2), arrangement (5, 11), synthesiser (5)
 Toshimaru Nakamura – no-input mixing board (2, 6, 2–1)
 Jan Bang – sampling (2, 3, 5, 8, 11), arrangement (3, 5, 8, 11)
 Fennesz – guitar (3, 4, 7), laptop (3, 4, 7)
 Evan Parker – saxophone (3, 6, 10)
 Werner Dafeldecker – acoustic bass (4, 7)
 Michi Wiancko – violin (4)
 Wendy Richman – violin (4)
 Katinka Kleijn – cello (4)
 Michael Moser – cello (4, 7)
 John Tilbury – piano (4, 6, 7)
 Franz Hautzinger – trumpet (4, 11)
 Helge Sten – guitar samples (5)
 Arve Henriksen – trumpet samples (5), trumpet (2–1)
 Sachiko M – sine wave sampling (6)
 Christian Wallumrød – piano samples (8)
 Tetuzi Akiyama – electric and acoustic guitars (9)
 Otomo Yoshihide – turntables (9)
 Claire Chase – bass flute (10, 12)
 Laura Moody – cello (2–1)
 Günter Müller – effects (2–1)
 Emma Smith – violin (2–1)
 Jennymay Logan – violin (2–1)
 Ros Stephen – violin (2–1)
 Charlie Cross – viola (2–1)
 Vince Sipprell – viola (2–1)

Technical

 David Sylvian – art direction, record producer, mixing (all except 4)
 George Bolster – cover artwork
 Chris Bigg – design
 Dai Fujikura – mixing (1, 4, 9, 10, 12)
 Erik Honoré – mixing (5, 11)
 Jan Bang – mixing (5, 8, 11)
 Fred Kevorkian – mastering
 Ted Young – strings recording (1, 6, 7, 9, 10, 12), flute recording (10, 12)
 Rupert Coulson – recording (2–1)

References 

2011 remix albums
David Sylvian albums
Samadhi Sound albums